Mitsotakis is a Greek surname. Notable people with the surname include:

Konstantinos Mitsotakis (1918–2017), Greek Prime Minister from 1990 to 1993 
Dora Bakoyannis (née Mitsotakis) (b. 1954), politician and Greek Foreign Minister; daughter of Prime Minister Konstantinos Mitsotakis
Kyriakos Mitsotakis (b. 1968) Greek Prime Minister since 2019; son of Konstantinos Mitsotakis
Maria Mitsotáki (1907–1974), Athens socialite and a principal character in epic poem The Changing Light at Sandover

Greek-language surnames